Brereton and Ravenhill is a civil parish in the district of Cannock Chase, Staffordshire, England.  It contains eleven buildings that are recorded in the National Heritage List for England.  Of these, one is listed at Grade II*, the middle grade, and the other is at Grade II, the lowest grade.  The parish contains Brereton, a suburb of the town of Rugeley and the countryside to the southwest.  The Trent and Mersey Canal passes through the parish, and the listed buildings associated with this are an accommodation bridge and a viaduct.  The other listed buildings are houses and associated structures, a church, a barn, a milestone, and a war memorial.


Key

Buildings

References

Citations

Sources

Lists of listed buildings in Staffordshire